Plebania is a Polish soap opera broadcast from October 5, 2000 to January 27, 2012 on TVP1. The series is about the lives of ordinary people in the fictional Polish village of Tulczyn. The plot revolves around the family, religious, and social issues of the village inhabitants with central roles played by a parish priest, his family and friends, and a wealthy business man known for shady dealings. Plebania is the second-longest (after Klan) Polish soap opera.

External links 
 

Polish television soap operas
2000 Polish television series debuts
2000s Polish television series
2010s Polish television series
2012 Polish television series endings
Telewizja Polska original programming